Karunamanjari  (Tamil: கருணமஞ்சரி) is an Indian Tamil-language soap opera that aired on Raj TV. The show stars Sudha Chandran, Ajay Rathnam, Vanaya and Puspalatha. The serial is directed and producer by Prabhu Nepal. The Serial Dubbed in Telugu language as Karunamanjari and aired on Vissa.

Plot
Karunamanjari story revolves around a lower-middle-class family and its story line, unlike other dramas forms twists and turns, mysteries.

Cast

Main cast

 Sudha Chandran as Indira
 Puspalatha as Manjari
 Vanaya / Ramya
 Ajay Rathnam

Additional cast

 Manokar
 Birla Bose
 K. S. Jayalakshmi 
 Priya
 Madhubala as Kalpana
 Raja
 Durka
 Nithya Ravindran

References

External links
 Raj TV Official Site 
 Raj TV on YouTube
 Raj Television Network

Raj TV television series
2009 Tamil-language television series debuts
2010 Tamil-language television series endings
Tamil-language television shows